José Alfonso López (born 22 June 1952) is a Colombian former professional racing cyclist. He rode in two editions of the Tour de France.

Major results
1976
 4th Overall Vuelta a Costa Rica
1st Sprints classification
1st Stages 3 & 5
1977
 1st Stage 5 Vuelta a Cundinamarca
 10th Overall Vuelta a Colombia
1981
 1st Stage 1 (TTT) Vuelta a Colombia
1982
 1st Stage 3 Tour de l'Avenir
 7th Overall Vuelta a Colombia
1983
 5th Overall Vuelta a Colombia

Grand Tour general classification results timeline

References

External links
 

1952 births
Living people
Colombian male cyclists
Sportspeople from Bogotá
20th-century Colombian people